Khanzada Khan may refer to:

Khanzada Rajput ruler of Mewat
 Khanzada Bahadur Khan (reign 1402–1412)
 Khanzada Feroz Khan (reign 1417–1422)
 Khanzada Jalal Khan (reign 1422–1443)
 Khanzada Ahmad Khan (reign 1443–1468)
 Khanzada Zakaria Khan (reign 1468–1485)
 Khanzada Alawal Khan (reign 1485–1504)
 Nawab Qutb Khan Khanzada, defeated Hindu Kambhos to takeover Sohna in 1570 and his clan was defeated and expelled in 1620 by the Sisodia Rajputs

Other
 Khanzada Khan (Pakistani politician) (fl. 1993–2015)

See also
 Khanzada Rajputs
 Khanzada (disambiguation)